The Campeonato Potiguar is the football league of the state of Rio Grande do Norte, Brazil.

Format

First Division

First stage: standard round-robin, in which all teams play each other once.

Second stage: home-and-away playoffs between the top 8 teams in the first stage. The winner of this stage is crowned the champion.

The team last placed in the first stage is relegated to the second division.

As in any other Brazilian soccer championship, the format can change every year.

Clubs

The following teams will compete in the Campeonato Piauiense in the 2023 season.

List of champions

Titles by team

Teams in bold stills active.

By city

Participation

Most appearances

Below is the list of clubs that have more appearances in the Campeonato Potiguar.

See also

Copa Cidade do Natal
Copa RN
Copa Rio Grande do Norte

External links
 FNF Official Website
RSSSF

 
Potiguar